The Norfolk Windmills Trust is a charity based in Norfolk, England, which restores and cares for windmills in that county.

Mills in its care (but not necessarily owned) include those at:
Ashtree Farm Mill
Berney Arms (English Heritage - pictured)
Billingford
Clayrack
Cley next the Sea
Denver Windmill
Dereham
Garboldisham
Great Bircham
Gunton Park Sawmill
Hobb's Mill
Horsey (NT)
Letheringsett Watermill
Little Cressingham
Old Buckenham
Paston (privately owned)
Starston
Stracey Arms
Sutton
Wicklewood

See also 
List of drainage windmills in Norfolk
List of windmills
Windmills in the United Kingdom

External links
Norfolk Windmills Trust website

 
Charities based in Norfolk